Banta Singh (born 1924) was an Indian wrestler. He competed in the men's freestyle lightweight at the 1948 Summer Olympics.

References

External links
 

1924 births
Possibly living people
Indian male sport wrestlers
Olympic wrestlers of India
Wrestlers at the 1948 Summer Olympics
Place of birth missing